is a city in Hyōgo Prefecture, Japan.

Geography
Tamba is located in an inland basin at an average elevation of 100 meters above sea level in the eastern part of the prefecture. It is located in the mountains between the Seto Inland Sea and the Sea of Japan. The uppermost stream of the Kako River system and the uppermost stream of the Yura River system, flow through the city, which has the lowest central watershed in Japan except for Hokkaido. The 35 degree east longitude meridian passes through the city.

Neighboring municipalities
Hyōgo Prefecture
Tamba-Sasayama
Nishiwaki
Asago
Taka
Kyoto Prefecture
Fukuchiyama

Climate
Tamba has a humid subtropical climate (Köppen climate classification Cfa) with hot summers and cool to cold winters. Precipitation is significantly higher in summer than in winter, though on the whole lower than most parts of Honshū, and there is no significant snowfall.

Demographics
Per Japanese census data, the population of Tamba in 2020 is 61,741 people. Tamba has been conducting censuses since 1920.

History
The area of Tamba was part of ancient Tanba Province, and corresponds almost exactly with ancient Hikami District. Numerous burial mounds from the Kofun period are located in the area. During the Sengoku period, the area was dominated by Akai Naomasa, nicknamed the "Red Demon of Tanba" from his stronghold at Kuroi Castle. The area was conquered by Akechi Mitsuhide under Oda Nobunaga, but Kuroi Castle did not fall until three years after Akai's death. Under the Tokugawa shogunate, Kaibara Domain was established for a cadet branch of the Oda clan. Following the Meiji restoration, the area became part of "Toyooka Prefecture" in 1871 before merging with Hyōgo Prefecture in 1876, and being organized into various villages and towns with the establishment of the modern municipalities system on April1, 1889.  The modern city of Tamba was established on November 1, 2004, from the merger of all six towns of the former Hikami District: Aogaki, Ichijima, Kaibara, Kasuga, Sannan, and Hikami. Tamba is a very small city with Hikami as the biggest of the six original towns.

Government
Tamba has a mayor-council form of government with a directly elected mayor and a unicameral city council of 20 members. Tamba contributes one member to the Hyogo Prefectural Assembly. In terms of national politics, the city is part of Hyōgo 5th district of the lower house of the Diet of Japan.

Economy
Tamba has mostly a rural economy based on agriculture and forestry. The area is especially noted for its production of black soybeans.

Education
Tamba has 22 public elementary schools and seven public middle schools operated by the city government and three public high schools operated by the Hyōgo Prefectural Department of Education. The prefecture also operates one special education school for the handicapped.

Transportation

Railway 
 JR West – Fukuchiyama Line
 -  -  -  -  -  - 
 JR West – Kakogawa Line
  -

Highways 
  Maizuru-Wakasa Expressway

Sister city relations
 - Auburn, Washington, United States, friendship city since August 11, 1968
 - Kent, Washington, United States, friendship city since November 24, 1969

Local attractions 
Kuroi Castle ruins, National Historic Site and one of the  Continued Top 100 Japanese Castles.
Kaibara Domain Jin'ya site, National Historic Site
Kaibara Hachiman Jinja

Notable people from Tamba 
Lady Kasuga, wet nurse of Shogun Tokugawa Iemitsu
 Takijirō Ōnishi, World War II IJN admiral, "the father of the kamikaze"
Kiichi Arita, politician and cabinet minister
Den Kenjirō, 8th Japanese Governor-General of Taiwan

Gallery

References

External links

  

Cities in Hyōgo Prefecture
Tamba, Hyōgo